The ancient Egyptian knot hieroglyph, or girdle knot, Gardiner sign listed no. S24, portrays a reef knot. Besides its use as a hieroglyph, it has usage in statuary and reliefs. The knot hieroglyph is also an amulet, typically made of worked stone, or as jewellery elements.

Language usage
The knot hieroglyph is used in the Egyptian language as the verb, (th)s, (th)ss, for to knot, to tie, to tie together, etc.V13:S24:O34-.-V13:O34:O34-S24 It is used as the phonogram for (th)s, as well as the determinative. There are many alternate spellings.

For the noun, it is Egyptian language (th)s, (th)s.t, S24:X1*Z1-.-S24:Z1-.-S24:O34-Z7:D40-.-S24:O34-G43-F41 for meanings of: knot, tie, ligature, backbone, vertebrae, spine, etc.

In jewellery and decoration
The knot used as an article of jewellery was especially known in the Middle Kingdom. It can be found in necklaces (see gallery photo), and as a small brooch. In Amulets of Ancient Egypt, a two-part, hollow gold piece is shown, with a detailed rope-detailed fiber; it is made with a tongue and groove closure for the parts.

{{s-ttl | title=S24| years=knot-- --'(th)s}}

Gallery

See also

Gardiner's Sign List#S. Crowns, Dress, Staves, etc.
List of Egyptian hieroglyphs
Square knot
Girdle of Isis

References

 Andrews, Carol, 1994. Amulets of Ancient Egypt, chapter 4: Scarabs for the living and funerary scarabs, pp 50–59, Andrews, Carol, c 1993, University of Texas Press, 518 amulets, 1, or multiples included in 12 necklaces; (softcover)
Budge.  An Egyptian Hieroglyphic Dictionary,'' E.A.Wallace Budge, (Dover Publications), c 1978, (c 1920), Dover edition, 1978. (In two volumes, 1314 pp, and cliv-(154) pp.) (softcover)

Egyptian hieroglyphs: crowns-dress-staves